Schalltechnik Dr.-Ing. Schoeps GmbH, known as Schoeps Mikrofone, is a German manufacturer of professional studio condenser microphones for recording and broadcast. The privately owned company is based in Karlsruhe, south-west Germany, and was founded in 1948.

Microphones
All microphones made by Schoeps employ traditional (i.e. externally polarized, not electret) condenser transducers, and use small-diaphragm, single-diaphragm capsules, even in microphones which offer two or three different directional patterns. All models introduced since 1973, as well as some models from even earlier, have featured transformerless output circuitry.

Colette

The Schoeps "Colette" (CMC) series of microphones is a series of four amplifiers, for different powering schemes, and about 20 capsules, for different directional patterns and/or frequency response characteristics; any capsule of the series is compatible with any of the amplifiers. This was the first type of microphone to let the user separate the capsule from the amplifier (body) of the microphone, via "active" accessories, e.g. thin, flexible cables, or "goosenecks", for the sake of a less obtrusive microphone setup. In this type of arrangement, the initial amplification stage of the microphone is located in the accessory, at the point where the capsule is connected; this helps to prevent interference or signal losses.

Most capsules of the CMC series are also available as one-piece compact microphones ("CCM series"). The circuitry is miniaturized so that each complete microphone is only a few millimeters longer than the corresponding "Colette" capsule would be. This simplifies installation and reduces the risk of interference in situations which would ordinarily require the use of Colette active accessories. However, since these microphones lack the modular construction of the CMC series, their capsules are not interchangeable.

Historical microphones
In the vacuum-tube era, Schoeps M 221-series microphones, especially the model M 221 B, were widely used in studios and for live orchestral recording. Their circuitry is based on the Telefunken AC 701k vacuum tube. They were introduced in 1954 and manufactured until the 1970s; many are still in use today.

One particular model of Schoeps microphone created for French radio (the CMT 20 series, 1964) has the historical distinction of being the first phantom-powered condenser microphone on the studio market.

See also
List of microphone manufacturers

References

External links
Schoeps Mikrofone

Audio equipment manufacturers of Germany
Companies based in Baden-Württemberg
Companies based in Karlsruhe
Microphone manufacturers
Manufacturing companies established in 1948
German brands